Windsorina is a group of plants in the family Rapateaceae described as a genus in 1923.

The only known species is Windsorina guianensis, endemic to the Kaieteur National Park along the Potaro River in Guyana.

The genus is named in honour of the House of Windsor, Royal Family of the United Kingdom.

References

Monotypic Poales genera
Rapateaceae
Endemic flora of Guyana
House of Windsor